Tobias Myers (born August 5, 1998) is an American professional baseball pitcher in the Milwaukee Brewers organization. He was selected by the Baltimore Orioles in the sixth round of the 2016 Major League Baseball draft.

Amateur career
Myers attended Winter Haven High School in Winter Haven, Florida. In 2016, as a senior, he went 8–2 with a 1.51 earned run average (ERA), striking out 79 batters in  innings pitched. He signed to play college baseball at the University of South Florida.

Professional career

Baltimore Orioles
Myers was selected by the Baltimore Orioles in the sixth round of the 2016 Major League Baseball draft. He signed with Baltimore for $225,000, forgoing his commitment to USF. Myers made his professional debut with the Rookie-level Gulf Coast League Orioles, compiling a 4.70 ERA in three starts. He began 2017 with the Aberdeen IronBirds of the Class A Short Season New York–Penn League.

Tampa Bay Rays
On July 31, 2017, Myers was traded to the Tampa Bay Rays in exchange for Tim Beckham. He was assigned to the Hudson Valley Renegades of the Class A Short Season New York–Penn League, where he finished the season. Over 12 starts between Aberdeen and Hudson Valley, he went 4–2 with a 3.54 ERA and a 0.98 WHIP. Myers spent 2018 with the Bowling Green Hot Rods of the Class A Midwest League. He pitched to a 10–6 record with a 3.71 earned run average in 23 games (21 starts).

He spent 2019 with the Charlotte Stone Crabs of the Class A-Advanced Florida State League, going 8–1 with a 2.31 ERA over 18 games (13 starts), striking out 59 over  innings. He did not play a minor league game in 2020 since the season was cancelled due to the COVID-19 pandemic.

To begin the 2021 season, he was assigned to the Montgomery Biscuits of the Double-A South. After appearing in 13 games (ten starts) and pitching to a 5–3 record with a 3.32 ERA and 81 strikeouts over  innings, he was promoted to the Durham Bulls of the Triple-A East in July. Over 12 starts with Durham, Myers went 3–4 with a 4.50 ERA and 65 strikeouts over 58 innings.

Cleveland Guardians
On November 19, 2021, Myers was traded to the Cleveland Guardians in exchange for Junior Caminero; the Guardians selected Myers to their 40-man roster upon acquiring him. He was assigned to the Columbus Clippers of the Triple-A International League to begin the 2022 season, with whom he was 1-9 with a 6.00 ERA over 14 starts. On July 2, he was designated for assignment.

San Francisco Giants
On July 7, 2022, the Guardians traded Myers to the San Francisco Giants in exchange for cash considerations. He made two appearances for the Triple-A Sacramento River Cats, allowing three runs in as many innings pitched. He was designated for assignment on July 31 following the acquisition of Dixon Machado.

Chicago White Sox
On August 2, 2022, Myers was claimed off waivers by the Chicago White Sox. On September 19, the White Sox released Myers. In 2022 in the minor leagues, he was 1–15 with a 7.82 ERA in 76 innings, and was second in the minor leagues in losses.

Milwaukee Brewers
Myers was signed to a minor league contract with the Milwaukee Brewers for 2023 and assigned to the Triple-A Nashville Sounds.

References

External links

Minor league baseball players
1998 births
Living people
Baseball pitchers
Baseball players from Florida
Sportspeople from Winter Haven, Florida
Gulf Coast Orioles players
Aberdeen IronBirds players
Hudson Valley Renegades players
Bowling Green Hot Rods players
Charlotte Stone Crabs players
Montgomery Biscuits players
Durham Bulls players
Columbus Clippers players
Charlotte Knights players
Gulf Coast Rays players
Sacramento River Cats players